Erysiphe alphitoides is a species of fungus which causes powdery mildew on oak trees.

Discovery and taxonomy 
Today oak powdery mildew is one of the most common diseases in European forests but it is thought to not always have been present in these forests. The first reports of the disease were made in Paris and other regions of France, Spain, Luxembourg and the Netherlands in 1907. By 1908 the disease had spread into many other European countries, becoming an epidemic. By 1909 it had reached Russia and Turkey, followed by Brazil in 1912 and soon after was distributed around the world. The sudden outbreak of the disease puzzled mycologists as they were unsure about the origin of the pathogen. Its anamorph was easily distinguished from Phyllactinia guttata which had previously been reported to cause powdery mildew on oaks in Europe at low intensity. It did however share morphological similarities with Oïdium quercinum, Calocladia penicillata and Microsphaera penicillata which had previously been reported to cause powdery mildew on oaks in Europe. The sudden appearance and high incidence of the disease made it unlikely that it was caused by any of these species however and instead some authors hypothesised that it was caused by the introduction of a new species from outside Europe. Powdery mildew had already been reported from North America so it was thought that the new disease could have been imported on American oaks into Europe. The absence of the disease on American red oaks growing in France however, made this unlikely. Four years after the initial outbreak, a teleomorph was found in south-east France which Arnaud and Fox identified as an American species, Microsphaera quercina (now included in Microsphaera alni). A detailed morphological study by Griffon and Maublanc in 1912 suggested that the species was different from all previously described species and proposed the name of Microsphaera alphitoides, referring to the floury appearance of the abundant white sporulation. This identification remained controversial until the 1940s. The origin of the disease was still uncertain however, in 1927, Raymond suggested that the disease may have been caused by a fungus identified in 1877 in Portugal that had been imported from Portuguese colonies. In 1980, Boesewinkel demonstrated that the same species was responsible for powdery mildew on Quercus robur and on a mango species from New Zealand, supporting the hypothesis that the fungus had shifted its host.

Recently, molecular biology has provided new tools for identifying species and elucidating their relatedness. A study of ribosomal DNA from 33 samples of oak powdery mildew from Europe showed that E. alphitoides contains identical sequences to Oïdium mangiferae, a major disease of mango in several tropical regions and Oïdium heveae, an economically important pathogen of the para rubber tree. These results support the findings of Boesewinkel and suggest that E. alphitoides and O. mangiferae could be conspecific. The origin of the species is still uncertain but Mougou et al. (2008) reported that E. alphitoides likely originated from the tropics and expanded its range to oak after being introduced to Europe.

Pathology
Only young developing leaves are susceptible to colonisation by E. alphitoides. It only induces necrosis when infection occurs very early during leaf development. Because the pathogen develops late in spring, after the first leaves of oak seedlings have developed, it is more prevalent on the second and third flushes of leaves that develop in July and August. This habit also reduces the severity of the disease on mature trees.

Effects on host
The disease can be very severe on Quercus robur and Quercus petraea in Europe, particularly on young trees. In mature trees the disease is generally less damaging, but in combination with other factors such as defoliation by insects can contribute to tree decline. A study of the effects of E. alphitoides on Quercus robur found it decreased stomatal conductance by 15–30%, did not affect the leaf mass to area ratio, decreased the nitrogen content of the leaf and increased dark respiration. Carbon fixation was also reduced in infected leaves by about 40–50% in fully infected leaves and those that were heavily infected were shed earlier than those not infected. Despite it affecting the ability of leaves to photosynthesise, the effect is low and this is thought to explain why the disease has only moderate consequences for tree health despite heavy infections. Because the infection makes the plants less shade tolerant, it may lead to the death of seedlings growing in shade.

Susceptible species
Aesculus hippocastanum (horse chestnut)
Quercus species
Wisteria

References

alphitoides
Fungal tree pathogens and diseases
Fungi described in 1912